Farizal Basri is a midfielder who currently plays for Woodlands Wellington FC in the S-League, joining them in early 2012 in time for the 2012 S.League.

His appearances for three S-League clubs, Sengkang Punggol, Home United and Woodlands Wellington FC between 2009 and 2012 have earned him the "journeyman" tag amongst journalists and pundits alike. He has also played for Tampines Rovers FC and the Young Lions during his career.

Farizal initially started off as a defender for the Young Lions and his solid performances at the back earned him a call-up to the national squad in 2004.

Now, he usually plays behind the front two, offering support from midfield. He is considered by many to be a natural playmaker.

Club Career Statistics

Farizal Basri's Profile

All numbers encased in brackets signify substitute appearances.

References

Singaporean footballers
Living people
1981 births
Tampines Rovers FC players
Warriors FC players
Balestier Khalsa FC players
Hougang United FC players
Woodlands Wellington FC players
Singapore Premier League players
Association football midfielders
Young Lions FC players